Kim Darby (born Deborah Zerby; July 8, 1947) is an American actress best known for her role as Mattie Ross in the film True Grit (1969).

Early life and film career
Darby was born Deborah Zerby in Los Angeles, the daughter of professional dancers Inga (Wiere) and Jon Zerby (the "Dancing Zerbys" or "Dancing Zerbies"). Her father nicknamed her Derby saying "I thought Derby Zerby would be a great stage name". Her mother was from Budapest. Her mother's siblings were comedians who performed as the Wiere Brothers. 

She performed as a singer and dancer under the name "Derby Zerby". Believing that she could not "hope for serious important roles in films with a name like "Derby Zerby", she renamed herself "Kim", because it was the name of a popular girl in her high school that she admired, and "Darby", as a variation of "Derby".

Darby began acting at age fifteen. Her first appearance was as a dancer in the film Bye Bye Birdie (1963). Her television work included Gunsmoke (1967 episodes "The Lure" and "Vengeance"); Bonanza (1967 episode "The Sure Thing"); and as a young girl approaching adulthood on an all-child planet in the "Miri" episode of the original Star Trek series.

Among her many films are True Grit, in which she played a fourteen-year-old when she was twenty-one years old; The Strawberry Statement (1970); Norwood (1970); The One and Only (1978); Better Off Dead (1985); and Halloween: The Curse of Michael Myers (1995).

Television roles
Darby's 1960s television roles included two appearances on the NBC series Mr. Novak, starring James Franciscus; she was cast as Julie Dean in "To Lodge and Dislodge" (1963) and as Judy Wheeler in "The Silent Dissuaders" (1965).

Darby also appeared about this time on The Eleventh Hour, The Fugitive, The Donna Reed Show, Ironside, and in the first season of Star Trek as the title character in "Miri". 
 
Darby was cast in an episode of the NBC sitcom The John Forsythe Show ("'Tis Better Have Loved and Lost", 1965). and as Angel in the two-part Gunsmoke episode "Vengeance". She appeared in the episode "Faire Ladies of France" (1967) of the NBC western series The Road West starring Barry Sullivan and a Bonanza episode "A Sure Thing" (1967) as Trudy Loughlin, guest starring Tom Tully as Burt Loughlin, her father.

She appeared in 3 episodes of Gunsmoke: "The Lure" (1967) as Carrie Neely, and "Vengeance: Part 1" (1967) and "Vengeance: Part 2" (1967) as Angel. She was cast in the 1972 movie, The People, which also starred William Shatner, reuniting them from their Star Trek appearance. She played the unhinged Virginia Calderwood in the first television miniseries, Rich Man, Poor Man in 1976.

Darby had the central role of Sally Farnham in the made-for-TV chiller Don't Be Afraid of the Dark (1973). Subsequent television roles included guest appearances on Crazy Like a Fox, Thriller, Family, The Love Boat, The Streets of San Francisco, Riptide, and Becker.

Darby admitted her career declined after the 1970s, in part because she had a dependency on amphetamines.

According to Pilar Wayne in her book My Life with John Wayne, Darby purposely set out to be rude to Wayne and others during the filming of True Grit. Wayne, for his part, called her a "spoiled brat". 

In 1990, she began to teach acting in the Los Angeles area and has been an instructor in the Extension Program at the University of California, Los Angeles since 1992. Darby also appeared in the 1999 The X-Files episode "Sein und Zeit" as a woman who confessed to the murder of her son, a boy who disappeared under circumstances similar to those being investigated by the lead characters, Fox Mulder and Dana Scully.

In 2014, she played Stacia Clairborne, a partially blind witness to a crime, in the episode "Prologue" of the show Perception.

Darby continues to make guest appearances on television and to make occasional films.

Personal life
Darby has been married twice. In 1968, she married James Stacy, with whom she had one child, Heather Elias, born in 1968. Their marriage ended in divorce in 1969. In 1970, she married James Westmoreland; the marriage ended in divorce after less than two months.

Filmography

Bye Bye Birdie (1963) as Teenager (uncredited)
Bus Riley's Back in Town (1965) as Gussie
The Restless Ones (1965) as April
The Karate Killers (1967) as Sandy True (archive footage)
Flesh and Blood (1968) TV movie as Faye
True Grit (1969) as Mattie Ross
Generation (1969) as Doris Bolton Owen
The Strawberry Statement (1970) as Linda
Norwood (1970) as Rita Lee Chipman
A Glimpse of Tiger (1971, abandoned)
Red Sky at Morning (1971) (uncredited)
The Grissom Gang (1971) as Barbara Blandish
The People (1972 TV movie) as Melodye Amerson
Don't Be Afraid of the Dark (1973 TV movie) as Sally Farnham
The Story of Pretty Boy Floyd (1974 TV movie) as Ruby Hardgrave
This Is the West That Was (1974 TV movie) as Calamity Jane
The One and Only (1978) as Mary Crawford
Flatbed Annie & Sweetiepie: Lady Truckers (1979 TV movie) as Sweetiepie
Enola Gay: The Men, the Mission, the Atomic Bomb (1980 TV movie) as Lucy Tibbets
The Capture of Grizzly Adams (1982 TV movie) as Kate Bradey
Summer Girl (1983 TV movie) as Mary Shelburne
First Steps (1985 TV movie) as Sherry Petrofsky
Embassy (1985) TV movie as Sue Davidson
Better Off Dead (1985) as Jenny Meyer
Teen Wolf Too (1987) as Professor Brooks
Halloween: The Curse of Michael Myers (1995) as Debra Strode
The Last Best Sunday (1999) as Mrs. Summers
Newsbreak (2000) as Frances Johnson
Mockingbird Don't Sing (2001) as Louise Standon
You Are So Going to Hell! (2004) as Louise
Dead Letters (2007) as Barbs
The Evil Within (2017) as Mildy Torres

TV appearances
Mr. Novak (1963, 1965)
Dr. Kildare (1964); Episode: "A Nickel's Worth of Prayer" as Patsy
Run for Your Life (1966); Episode: "Hang Down Your Head and Laugh"
The Fugitive (1966); Episode: "Joshua's Kingdom"
Star Trek (1966); Episode: "Miri"
The Man from U.N.C.L.E. (1967); Episode: "The Five Daughters Affair"
Ironside (1967); pilot film for the NBC series of the same name
Bonanza (1967); Episode: "The Sure Thing"
Gunsmoke (1967); Season 12, Episode 23: "The Lure" as Carrie Neely
Gunsmoke (1967); Season 13, Episodes 4 & 5: "Vengeance, Part 1 & 2" as Angel with James Stacy
The Streets of San Francisco (1972); pilot for the TV series of the same name
Circle of Fear (1973); Episode: "Dark Vengeance"
Love Story (1973); Episode: "Joie"
Police Story (1974); Episodes: "Captain Hook" & "Wyatt Earp Syndrome"
Thriller (1975); Series 5, Episode 5: "Good Salary - Prospects - Free Coffin" as Helen
Rich Man, Poor Man (1976); Miniseries
Family (1978); Episode: "Princess in the Tower" as Lily Barker
The Last Convertible (1979); Miniseries
The Love Boat (1979, 1982)
Fantasy Island (1982); Episode: The Challenge / A Genie Named Joe" The Facts of Life (1984); Episode: "Joint Custody" as Doris Garrett Murder, She Wrote (1984) Episode: "We're Off to Kill the Wizard" & (1995) Episode: "Film Flam"Scarecrow & Mrs. King (1985) Episode: "Over the Limit"The X-Files (1999); Episode: "Sein und Zeit"Becker (1999); Episode: "Point of Contact" Perception'' (2014); Episode: "Prologue"

References

External links

Home Page

1947 births
Living people
Actresses from Los Angeles
American film actresses
American people of Hungarian descent
American television actresses
Western (genre) film actresses
21st-century American women